The M10 is a motorway proposed  in  Punjab and Balouchistan province, Pakistan. The motorway would be 570 km long, out of which 190 km would be in Punjab province and 380 km in Baluchistan province. It would be 4 laned and on completion would reduce travelling time from Multan to Quetta to 7 hours from 18 hours.

There would be six service and rest areas in the motorway. A tunnel under Koh-e-Suleman is also in plan, which not only reduce the distance but would also ease the difficulty of the traveler which now have to Climb the mountain.

Route
The proposed route begins from the existing M4 and M5 junction and heads toward Muzafargarh and then to D.G Khan. Then from D.G Khan it runs parallel to N70 (existing Multan Quetta highway) till Girdu Pass from it would be tunneled to Rakni the first town of Baluchistan province. From Rakni it goes through beautiful landscapes of Barkhan, Kingri, Makhter, and touch the Loralai, after Loralai it turns to Qillasaif Ullah and end near Kuchlak a suburb of Quetta city.

References

Proposed roads in Pakistan